Gabane is a village in Kweneng District of Botswana. It is located 15 km (10 mi) west of Gaborone, the capital of Botswana. The population was 10,399 in 2001 census, making it the fourth largest settlement in Kweneng. Its population was 14,842 at the 2011 census. It's now part of Gaborone agglomeration home to 421,907 inhabitants at the 2011 census.

This village is originally home to BaMalete tribe. Kgosi Mosadi Seboko is the paramount chief and is stationed at Ramotswa, the capital of Balete. The elder population is still very much into agriculture while the younger generations are more urbanized.

The culture of Gabane

Gabane is well known for her lively music scene and night life as well as contemporary fashion trends. The village has produced several live bands like Matsieng and Franco and Afro Musica. The Gabaneans are passionate football followers. Their most successful team, Uniao Flamengo Santos, plays in the National Premier League. There a few teams playing at regional football level, under Kweneng Region, they are Gabane United; Moritshane Lions and Blackburn Callies, whilst Jet Fighters plays in Gaborone Region

Notable natives
Gabane is home to:

Uniao Flamengo Santos
Frank Lesokwane the leader of a kwasa-kwasa band called Franco and Afro Musica.
Matsieng traditional group.
Miso Mmereki, an influential Radio and Television personality.
Innocent Ranku, a [[Uniao Flamengo Santos, Notwane and 
Zebras]] midfielder.
Emma wareus former miss Botswana,first princess miss world,Beijing china
Shimane Shakes Ntshweu, a former Uniao Flamengo Santos, Mogoditshane Fighters and Zebras midfielder.
Pius Mokgware, a member of parliament Republic of Botswana.
vangauteng the comedian a renowned comedian in the entertainment industry
junior "jujuvine" sekolokwane a comedian, business man,a socialite
oefile mawee Mokgware stand up comedian

See also

List of cities in Botswana

References

Kweneng District
Villages in Botswana